Alison Wearing (born 1967) is a Canadian writer and performer most noted for her memoir and solo play, Confessions of a Fairy's Daughter.

Early years and education 
Wearing was born in Peterborough, Ontario in 1967. Her mother and father were both pianists and Wearing speaks of music as her "mother tongue". Wearing's father, Joseph Wearing, was also a professor of Political Studies at Trent University.  Alison Wearing left high school in Canada to study French at the University of Nantes. She returned to Canada to study music at the University of Western Ontario, then political science at Wilfrid Laurier University and the University of Marburg, Germany.

Career
Alison Wearing's writing career began with articles and stories written while living in Prague, where she taught English to members of Václav Havel's first post-revolutionary government of Czechoslovakia. Her first short story, Notes From Under Water, was published first in the Queen's Quarterly and then selected for the Journey Prize Anthology (McClelland and Stewart, 1994). Staring Down the Beast, a longform essay about travels in Serbia during the Balkan War, won the 1994 Canadian National Magazine Award Gold Medal for Travel Writing. Solitary Motion, an essay about travels in northwestern China, won the 1995 Western Canada Magazine Award 1st Prize, also for Travel Writing.

Wearing's first book was the internationally acclaimed travel memoir, Honeymoon in Purdah (Alfred A. Knopf Canada, 2000), her account of a trip to Iran. The Calgary Sun called it "the perfect travel memoir" and the Ottawa Citizen hailed it as "one of the best pieces of travel writing it has been my privilege to read in this, or any, millennium." The book was published in seven countries.

After moving to central Mexico in 2002, Wearing turned her attention to the performing arts, singing, recording and touring with world/folk musician Jarmo Jalava, and studying dance and choreography. Her first solo play, Giving Into Light, combines literary chronicles with music and dance. It toured Canadian Fringe Festivals, where it won two Best of Fest awards, Best Drama, and was a finalist for Best Fringe Production of 2012 (CBC/CTV/CVV).

Confessions of a Fairy's Daughter, is both a memoir (Alfred A. Knopf Canada, 2013) and a solo play. Autobiographical in nature, Confessions of a Fairy's Daughter tells the story of growing up with a gay father in Peterborough, Canada, in the 1980s. The memoir was nominated for the RBC/Taylor Prize for Non-Fiction, shortlisted for the Edna Staebler Award for Creative Nonfiction, and named one of the Top 50 Books of 2013 by Indigo Books.

Moments of Glad Grace (ECW Press) was published in 2020. “This is a wise, funny, and tender book, beautifully written and perfectly executed from first to last sentence. It’s about a daughter and her ageing father, it’s about genealogy and identity, it’s about Ireland, but actually it’s about how we love the ones we love. Moments of Glad Grace is a travelogue of the heart. It’s a road you’ll want to travel.” Yann Martel, author of Life of Pi.

Wearing has served as a juror for the Governor General's Award for Engligh language non-fiction, a reader for the CBC Literary Prize, a mentor for the University of Guelph MFA Creative Writing program, a faculty member of the Under The Volcano masterclass program, and Writer-in-Residence at Trent University, the University of Guelph, and Green College, University of British Columbia, where she has since been appointed a Distinguished Visiting Fellow. 

Wearing facilitates Memoir Writing Ink, an online writing program, and administers the International Amy MacRae Award for Memoir.

Awards 
Literature:
2014: Shortlisted for the Edna Staebler Award for Creative Non-Fiction
2014: Nominated for the RBC/Taylor Prize for Non-Fiction
2013: Top 50 Books of 2013, Indigo Books
1998: Western Canada Magazine Award 1st Prize
1995: National Magazine Award Gold Medal
1994: Finalist, Journey Prize

Theatre:
2013: Best Dramatic Script, United Solo Festival, New York City
2013: Critics' Choice Finalist, Vancouver Fringe Festival
2013: Best Drama, Victoria Fringe Festival
2013: Pick of the Fringe, Winnipeg Fringe Festival
2013: Outstanding Solo Show, CBC Manitoba
2012: Best of Fest, Stratford Springworks Festival
2012: Critics' Choice Finalist: Best Fringe Production of 2012
2012: Best of Fest, Fringetastic Festival
2011: Best of Fest, Wakefield Fringe Festival
2011: Best Drama, Victoria Fringe Festival
2010: Best of Fest, Wakefield Fringe Festival

Bibliography 
"Notes From Under Water" Journey Prize Anthology 6, 1994, 978-0771044298 
Honeymoon in Purdah: an Iranian journey, 2001, 
"My Life as a Shadow" Dropped Threads 2, edited by Carol Shields and Marjorie Anderson, 2003, 
"The Motherhood Roadshow" AWOL: Tales for Travel-Inspired Minds, edited by Jennifer Barclay and Amy Logan, 2003, 
Confessions of a Fairy's Daughter, 2013, 
Moments of Glad Grace, 2020,

Plays 
Giving Into Light, Directed by Stuart Cox, 2009
Confessions of a Fairy's Daughter, Directed by Stuart Cox, 2011

References

External links

1967 births
Living people
21st-century Canadian dramatists and playwrights
21st-century Canadian women writers
Canadian travel writers
Canadian memoirists
Canadian women dramatists and playwrights
People from Peterborough, Ontario
Canadian women memoirists
Women travel writers
Writers from Ontario
21st-century memoirists